Sergey Karginov (born 5 September 1969, Vologda) is a Russian political figure and a deputy of the 6th, 7th, and 8th State Dumas.
 
From 1987 to 1989, Karginov served in the Soviet Army. During the 1990s, he held various positions at industrial enterprises, including Koncor CJSC, Joker LLP, PAG LLP. In 1999, he initiated publishing of the magazine Tax news of the Vologda region, and in 2002-2003 he was the editor-in-chief of the journal. From 2000 to 2002, he was an advisor to the deputy of the State Duma. In 2003, he was elected deputy of the Legislative Assembly of the Vologda Oblast. In 2011, he was elected deputy of the 6th State Duma. In 2016 and 2021, he was re-elected deputy of the 7th and 8th State Dumas.

References
 

 

1969 births
Living people
Liberal Democratic Party of Russia politicians
21st-century Russian politicians
Eighth convocation members of the State Duma (Russian Federation)
Seventh convocation members of the State Duma (Russian Federation)
Sixth convocation members of the State Duma (Russian Federation)
People from Vologda